EVPL may refer to:
 Ethernet Virtual Private Line, a data service defined by Metro Ethernet Forum, providing a point-to-point Ethernet connection
 Envoplakin, a human gene
 Evansville Vanderburgh Public Library